is a trans-Neptunian object of the scattered disc on an eccentric orbit in the outermost region of the Solar System. It was first observed on 25 March 2014, by American astronomers Scott Sheppard and Chad Trujillo at the Cerro Tololo Observatory in Chile.

Orbit and classification 

 and based on an  orbital uncertainty of 6–7 and an observation arc of only 682 days,  orbits the Sun at a distance of 40.1–104.2 AU once every 612 years and 10 months (223,847 days; semi-major axis of 72.15 AU). Its orbit has an eccentricity of 0.44 and an inclination of 30° with respect to the ecliptic.

Based on the best-fit (albeit uncertain) orbital solution,  is a scattered disc object, or "near-scattered" in the classification of the Deep Ecliptic Survey, that still interacts gravitationally with Neptune due to its relatively low perihelion of 40.1 AU, contrary to the extended-scattered/detached objects and sednoids which never approach Neptune as close as  does.

Most distant objects from the Sun 

 last came to perihelion around 1865, moving away from the Sun ever since and is currently about 85.6 AU from the Sun, which is further away than the dwarf planet . Other than long-period comets, it is the 10th-most-distant known larger body in the Solar System (also see ).

Physical characteristics 

, no rotational lightcurve for this object has been obtained from photometric observations. The body's rotation period, pole and shape remain unknown.

See also 
 List of Solar System objects most distant from the Sun

References

External links 
 List of Transneptunian Objects, Minor Planet Center
 
 

Minor planet object articles (unnumbered)

20140325